Sir Percy Carter Buck (25 March 1871 – 3 October 1947) was an English music educator, writer, organist, and composer.

Early life and education
Percy Buck was born in West Ham, London, and studied at Merchant Taylors' School, the Guildhall School of Music under Charles Joseph Frost (1848-1918) and Francis Davenport, and then at Royal College of Music, where his teachers were Walter Parratt, C.H. Lloyd and Hubert Parry.

Career
From 1891 until 1894 he was organ scholar at Worcester College, Oxford, where he became friends with William Henry Hadow, Classics Tutor there at the time, who became the first editor of the Oxford History of Music in 1896. Buck was appointed organist at Wells Cathedral (1896–99), then Bristol Cathedral (1899–1901). He became director of music at Harrow School in 1901 and held that post until 1927. While at Harrow, Buck served on the editorial board of the ten-volume anthology Tudor Church Music.

From 1910 to 1920, Buck was Professor of Music at Trinity College, Dublin; this was a non-residential post, succeeding Ebenezer Prout. His pupils during this period included Ina Boyle. In 1919 Sir Hugh Allen invited him to join the staff of the Royal College of Music, where he set up a teacher's training course, contributing his own lectures on psychology. In 1925, Buck became the King Edward Professor of Music in the University of London.

In 1926 he started the RCM Junior Department with Miss Angela Bull, a "feeder system" for students financed by the London County Council. Several successful students have gone through this program and it continues to this day. From 1927 to 1936, he was music adviser to the London County Council, where he developed new facilities for further training of children with special talent, and where he overhauled the music in the curriculum of schools. Buck received a knighthood in 1937 on retiring from the University of London, while continuing his duties at the Royal College, supervising teachers and taking the occasional composition student, including Madeleine Dring for two years from 1938.

Personal life
Buck married Lucy Bond, daughter of the surgeon Thomas Bond. She died in 1940, aged 68. There were three sons (one killed in World War I) and two daughters. But during his time at Harrow Buck began a clandestine and long-term relationship with Sylvia Townsend Warner, whose father was a History master at the school. He was 41, she was 19. From 1917 Warner, who was to pursue a career as a poet and novelist after the publication of her first novel, Lolly Willowes in 1926, also worked as one of the editors of Tudor Church Music.

Percy Buck died at the Stoneycrest Nursing Home, Hindhead, Surrey, after a short illness.

Works

Musical compositions
Buck's compositions include a piano quintet (Op. 17), a string quintet (Op. 19),  a violin sonata (Op. 21), and a piano quartet (Op. 22). These were all unpublished, and many of his early manuscripts were later destroyed in World War II during an air raid. The three organ sonatas - Op. 3 (1896), Op. 9 (1902) and Op. 12 (1904) were published in Leipzig and so survived, along with some piano works and songs. The orchestral work Croon, in the style of an Irish lullaby, was performed at The Proms in September 1917. There was also an orchestral overture, Coeur de Lion Op. 18.

Buck composed a number of hymn tunes - fourteen of them were included in the 1916 edition of Hymns Ancient and Modern - most notably , written in 1913 as a setting for the Christian hymn "The Royal Banners Forward Go", to be sung at Harrow School (Gonfalon is a Norman word for a banner).

Writings
He is possibly best remembered today for his writing and editing. He edited The English Psalter (London, 1925) with Charles Macpherson. The Oxford Song Book of English national and folk songs for schools was issued in 1929, followed by The Oxford Nursery Song Book in 1934. His books include The Scope of Music (1924, derived from the Cramb lectures he delivered in Glasgow the previous year), and Psychology for Musicians (1944), written long before the subject became fashionable in the 1960s. He was on the editorial board for OUP's Tudor Church Music and revised the first two volumes of the Oxford History of Music (1929 and 1932), also contributing a new introductory volume (1929).

The Organ: a Complete Method for the Study of Technique and Style (London, 1909)
Unfigured Harmony (Oxford, 1911)
Organ Playing (London, 1912)
The First Year at the Organ (London, 1913)
Acoustics for Musicians (Oxford, 1918)
The Scope of Music (Oxford, 1924)
A History of Music (London, 1929)
 The Oxford Song Book Volume 1 (1929)
 The Oxford Nursery Song Book (Oxford, 1933)
Psychology for Musicians (London, 1944)

References

External links

Colles, H.C., and Turner, Malcolm. "Buck, Sir Percy (Carter)". Grove Music Online (subscription access).
Chant 62

 

1871 births
1947 deaths
People educated at Merchant Taylors' School, Northwood
Alumni of the Royal College of Music
British music educators
English composers
English classical organists
British male organists
Cathedral organists
Teachers at Harrow School
Male classical organists
Presidents of the Independent Society of Musicians